Kiley Reid (born 1987) is an American novelist. Her debut novel, Such a Fun Age, was published in December 2019 and was longlisted for the 2020 Booker Prize.

Early life and education
Reid was born in Los Angeles, California, in 1987 and raised in Tucson, Arizona, from the age of seven to 20. She graduated from Salpointe Catholic High School and studied theater at the University of Arizona for two years before transferring to Marymount Manhattan College. Reid later graduated from the Iowa Writers' Workshop.

Career
Reid's debut novel, Such a Fun Age, was published by G. P. Putnam's Sons on December 31, 2019. It was published by Bloomsbury Publishing in the United Kingdom on January 7, 2020. It was longlisted for the Booker Prize in July 2020 and won the International Book of the Year at the 2021 Australian Book Industry Awards.

The novel, which explores the relationship between a young black babysitter and her well-intentioned white employer, was ranked No. 3 on the New York Times hardcover fiction list within two weeks of its U.S. release. The novel received generally positive reviews from numerous media outlets, including The Washington Post, Entertainment Weekly, NPR, and The Atlantic magazine. It was the first selection of 2020 for Reese Witherspoon's book club.

The Washington Posts review said that "Reid constructs a plot so beautifully intricate and real and fascinating that readers will forget it’s also full of tough questions about race, class and identity." The Atlantic described the book as "a funny, fast-paced, empathetic examination of privilege in America." A review in The New York Times noted the book's "resonant insights into the casual racism in everyday life, especially in the America of the liberal elite," but described Reid's scenes and dialogue as feeling "deliberately styled for a screen adaptation," with "heavy-handed attempts to mimic millennial parlance."

Reid, who spent six years caring for the children of wealthy Manhattanites, began the novel while applying to graduate school. She completed it while earning her MFA degree from the Iowa Writers' Workshop, where she was awarded the Truman Capote Fellowship and taught undergraduate creative writing workshops with a focus on race and class. The book and screen rights to the story were acquired before she graduated.

Reid's short stories have been featured in Ploughshares, December, New South, and Lumina.

Personal life
Reid lives in Philadelphia with her husband.

Bibliography

Novels

Short stories
 "George Washington's Teeth" (Ploughshares, October 2019)

References

External links

Living people
1987 births
21st-century American novelists
21st-century American women writers
African-American novelists
American women novelists
Novelists from Arizona
Writers from Tucson, Arizona
Writers from Los Angeles
Writers from Philadelphia
Iowa Writers' Workshop alumni
Marymount Manhattan College alumni
University of Arizona alumni
Novelists from California
Novelists from Pennsylvania
21st-century African-American women writers
21st-century African-American writers
20th-century African-American people
20th-century African-American women